Myeni is a South African surname. Notable people with the surname include:

Dudu Myeni (born 1963), South African businesswoman
Ernest Myeni (born 1968), South African politician
Sifiso Myeni (born 1988), South African football player 

Surnames of African origin